The following is a list of parks in Brunei Darussalam.

Arts and Heritage Parks 
 Tasek Merimbun Heritage Park (7800 square hectares)

Recreational Parks 

 Tasek Sarubing Recreational Park 
 Tasek Lama Recreational Park

Brunei-related lists
Brunei Darussalam